Thrift Drug was a U.S. pharmacy chain founded in 1935 and based in Pittsburgh, Pennsylvania.

The company was purchased by JCPenney in 1968, and was expanded greatly thereafter, serving as the flagship chain of JCPenney's pharmacy group. The chain did not hide its affiliation with JCPenney, as it had JCPenney catalog merchandise pickup centers inside many of its locations, as well as signs advertising "JCPenney Catalog Center".  Stores also accepted the JCPenney credit card for purchases.

In 1996, JCPenney purchased Eckerd, another pharmacy chain. The U.S. Federal Trade Commission (FTC) objected to the purchase on antitrust grounds, stating that ownership of Eckerd would give JCPenney a dominant position in the drug store business in the states of North Carolina and South Carolina through its ownership of Thrift Drug, Rite Aids in the Carolinas, and Eckerd. The FTC ultimately approved the transaction, but as a condition of approval, in 1997 JCPenney and Thrift were required to divest 14 Thrift drug stores in Charlotte and 20 Thrift stores in Raleigh-Durham, as well as all 110 Rite Aid locations in the state of North Carolina and that chain's 17 locations in Charleston. As a result, JCPenney divested 164 stores in the Carolinas. The divested stores were purchased by an investment group led by former Thrift Drug executives who left JCPenney after the Eckerd transaction. These stores became the Kerr Drug chain, using the name of a former Carolinas chain acquired by JCPenney in 1995.

After acquiring Eckerd, in 1997 JCPenney merged Thrift Drug and all other pharmacy chains into the larger Eckerd chain (now CVS Pharmacy and Rite Aid).

One enduring legacy of Thrift Drug was in the 1977 movie Slap Shot, when a Thrift Drug located in downtown Johnstown, Pennsylvania was shown in the background during a shot of downtown Charlestown (the town that Johnstown portrayed in the film), alongside other now-defunct retailers such as Woolworth (which still exists today as Foot Locker but closed their namesake chain in 1997) and competitor Revco (which was later acquired by CVS Pharmacy). Also shown was a location of Thrift Drug's nominal successor (through Eckerd) and fellow Pennsylvania pharmacy, Rite Aid. Due to Rite Aid's connection to Thrift Drug through Eckerd, Rite Aid, as well as CVS which also purchased many Eckerd stores, accept JCPenney credit cards despite having otherwise had no corporate affiliation with JCPenney.

References

Defunct pharmacies of the United States
Retail companies disestablished in 1997
Rite Aid
JCPenney
Retail companies established in 1935
Health care companies based in Pennsylvania